Karen Sheperd (born November 12, 1961) is an American actress, martial artist and keynote speaker with an extensive career in film, theatre and television.

In 1979, Sheperd was the first woman to hold the title of #1 Women's Black Belt Forms Champion for the ″Karate Illustrated″ ratings, a title she retained again in 1980.  Sheperd was also the first woman to be rated #1 Women's Black Belt Forms competitor in the "STAR System″ ratings in 1980. She is considered a martial arts legend and pioneer for advancing recognition for female martial artists worldwide.

Career

Acting
During her reign as the #1 Women's Black Belt forms champion, Sheperd received an offer from Tadashi Yamashita to star in The Shinobi Ninja.  She retired from competition to accept this offer, becoming the first American female martial artist to become an action film star. 

After filming Shinobi Ninja in Japan in 1981, Sheperd relocated to study acting in Los Angeles, California.

A few of the films she subsequently starred in are: 
Cyborg 2 with Angelina Jolie and Jack Palance
Righting Wrongs (aka 'Above the Law') with Cynthia Rothrock
America 3000.

Sheperd is known for her character as "The Enforcer" on television's Hercules: The Legendary Journeys. Her first episode, titled "The Enforcer", received the highest ratings for the entire series. Author Robert Weisbrot said "The fight scenes between Hercules and the Enforcer are among the series' best".

Sheperd has performed on stage (theatre) in such plays as Summer and Smoke by Tennessee Williams and In the Boom Boom Room by David Rabe.

Martial arts

Sheperd was the first woman to be officially rated #1 World Karate Champion in forms, a title she held for two years, 1979 and 1980.  Prior to that, there were no ratings for women in martial arts Forms/Kata competition.  In 1974, Mike Anderson's "Professional Karate" magazine rated women and men in one category. Before "Professional Karate" (published by  went out of business, one of Sheperd's teachers, Malia Dacascos-Bernal was rated in the top 10. Often the only woman competing against a field of men, Sheperd believed more women would compete if they had a title to compete for.  Karen Sheperd arranged a meeting with Renardo Barden, the editor of "Karate Illustrated" (the only existing ratings system for martial artists at the time) to see what could be done to help draw more women to compete in martial arts tournaments and to help organize  separate ratings for women.  Under Barden's direction, Sheperd organized a petition to establish the title and garnered the support of tournament promoters to begin offering separate forms divisions for female competitors.  Sheperd's goal was obtained and Karate Illustrated Magazine established the first official ratings for female forms competitors in 1979. Having gained the highest accumulated 1st place points on the Karate competition circuit, Sheperd achieved the #1 rating by Karate Illustrated Magazine for 1979 and 1980. Sheperd's vision also became reality as she saw the number of women competitors increase by double and triple in the following years. 

Sheperd also had the distinction of being the first #1 Women's Forms Champion in the STAR System World Kickboxing Ratings (Standardized Tournaments And Ratings) System which was established in 1980 by editor Paul Maslak for Kick Illustrated Magazine.

Sheperd was the first woman to ever win the Grand Championship title over all male and female forms competitors at the US Open Battle of the Superstars at the Bayfront Center in St. Petersburg, Florida on November 1, 1980. Her victory with her signature chain whip was featured on "The World of People" television show. Her win drew National attention, including a report on the National nightly news.

As the nation's top-rated woman, Karen Sheperd continued her dominance by defeating Belinda Davis, Cynthia Rothrock and Lori Clapper in Women's Black Belt Forms at the Diamond Nationals on May 2, 1981, in Minneapolis, Minnesota.

Following Cynthia Rothrock's appearance on the cover of "Karate Illustrated" magazine (Aug 1981), Karen Sheperd was the second woman to grace the cover of ″Karate Illustrated″ Magazine (Feb 1982), the first of many magazine covers she would appear on.

In 1992 Sheperd was voted the "Most Popular Female Martial Arts Superstar" by readers of Inside Kung Fu Magazine. In 1997 Sheperd was inducted into the prestigious Black Belt Hall of Fame as "Woman of the Year". In 2002, she was inducted into the Martial Arts History Museum Hall of Fame.

She currently holds the rank of “Professor” 8th degree Black Belt (martial arts) in the art of Wun Hop Kuen Do, based on the Kajukenbo system founded by Al Dacascos.  While Al Dacascos is her head instructor in Wun Hop Kuen Do, Sheperd was the protégé (for forms competition) of Malia Bernal, stepmother of Mark Dacascos.

Filmography

Film

Television

References

External links
 
 Official web site of Karen Sheperd

1961 births
Living people
American female martial artists
American wushu practitioners
American film actresses
American television actresses
American stunt performers
21st-century American women